Civilian-run enterprise is a type of company or enterprise to describe a non-state-owned enterprise (state-owned enterprise including companies owned by the state, the central and regional government) in the People's Republic of China. A privately held company is a type of civilian-run enterprise. However, there is no proper legal definition of "civilian-run enterprise" in China. It is considered to be a special term in the Economy of China (Minqi or ). The translation of the term "Minqi" was difficult, as stated by Ye Dong, a Chinese businessman during an interview by the Chinese-language version of the Financial Times.

A civilian-run enterprise may be a publicly traded company or a privately held company (any company that is not owned by a government nor listed on the stock exchange). If the company is listed in Hong Kong (and incorporated outside mainland China), it would be referred to as a P chip.

Notable civilian-run enterprises in China
 Fosun International
 Hainan Airlines
 Suning Commerce Group (blue chip of Shenzhen Stock Exchange)
 Wanda Group (one of the 2016 Fortune Global 500)
 Sunac China
 LeEco

References

Types of business entity
Finance in China